Genlisea pygmaea is a corkscrew plant native to South America.

References 

pygmaea
Carnivorous plants of South America
Flora of Brazil
Plants described in 1833